The Ministry of Agriculture is a department of the Namibian government. It was established at Namibian independence in 1990. The first Namibian minister of agriculture was Gert Hanekom. Its  minister is Calle Schlettwein.

Additional portfolios
In 1990 the ministry was established as Ministry of Agriculture, Fisheries, Water and Rural Development. In 1991 the portfolio of fisheries was split off, and a separate Ministry of Fisheries and Marine Resources was created. In 2000 the portfolio of rural development was removed, too, and given to the Ministry of Regional and Local Government. The agriculture ministry was renamed Ministry of Agriculture, Water and Forestry.

In 2020 the ministry experienced its  change of responsibilities. The portfolio of land reform was added after the disestablishment of the Ministry of Land Reform. The forestry portfolio was given to the Ministry of Environment and Tourism, and the agriculture ministry was thus renamed Ministry of Agriculture, Water and Land Reform.

Ministers
All agriculture ministers in chronological order are:

References

External links
Official website Ministry of Agriculture, Water and Land Reform

Agriculture
Agriculture
Economy of Namibia
1990 establishments in Namibia